LDAC is a proprietary audio coding technology developed by Sony, which allows streaming high-resolution audio over Bluetooth connections at up to 990 kbps at 24 bit/96 kHz. It is used by various products, including headphones, earphones, smartphones, portable media players, active speakers, and home theaters.

The encoder of LDAC is open-source under Apache License 2.0, so that any device can be coded to transmit LDAC streams without patent or licensing issues. The decoder design remains proprietary.

Audio coding
LDAC is an alternative to Bluetooth SIG's SBC codec. Its main competitors are Qualcomm's aptX-HD/aptX Adaptive and the HWA Union/Savitech's LHDC.

LDAC utilizes a type of lossy compression  by employing a hybrid coding scheme based on the modified discrete cosine transform and Huffman coding to provide more efficient data compression. By default, LDAC audio bitrate settings are set to Best Effort, which switches between 330/660/990 kbps depending on connection strength; however, audio bitrate and resolution can be manually adjusted on Linux (when using PipeWire), some Android platforms (which generally requires access to the "Developer Settings" menu), and Sony's own smartphones and Walkman devices at the following rates; 330/660/990 kbps at 96/48 kHz and 303/606/909 kbps at 88.2/44.1 kHz with depth of 24 or 16 bits. .

Starting from Android 8.0 "Oreo", LDAC is part of the Android Open Source Project, enabling every OEM to integrate this standard into their own Android devices freely. The encoder library is open source and the implementation for Linux is already present in bluez-alsa, pulseaudio-modules-bt, and in PipeWire's bluez5 module. It is available on Fedora with RPM Fusion since Fedora 30. However the decoder library is proprietary, so receiving devices require licenses.

On 17 September 2019, the Japan Audio Society (JAS) certified LDAC with their Hi-Res Audio Wireless certification. Currently the only codecs with the Hi-Res Audio Wireless certification are LDAC and LHDC.

See also 
 Lossy data compression
 List of codecs

References

External links 
 
Sony Australia | Latest Technology News | Electronics | Entertainment
LDAC codec source code in the Android Open Source Project

Audio codecs